Pilkhana may refer to:
 Pilkhana, Bangladesh
 Pilkhana, Uttar Pradesh
 Pilkhana, West Bengal